Blackie Lake is a lake in Madera County, California, in the United States.

Blackie Lake was named for Herb Black, a Department of Fish and Game official.

See also
List of lakes in California

References

Lakes of California
Lakes of Madera County, California
Lakes of Northern California